USS Welch is a name used more than once by the United States Navy:

 USS Welch (PC-817), a patrol craft commissioned on 13 July 1943.
 , a gunboat commissioned 8 September 1969.

United States Navy ship names